Earl C. Gurley (August 6, 1898 – November 6, 1968) was an American Negro league outfielder between 1922 and 1932.

A native of Chattanooga, Tennessee, Gurley attended Howard High School. He made his Negro leagues debut in 1922 with the St. Louis Stars, and went on to play for several teams, including the Chicago American Giants and Birmingham Black Barons. Gurley finished his career in 1932 with the Montgomery Grey Sox. He died in Buffalo, New York in 1968 at age 70.

References

External links
 and Seamheads

1898 births
1968 deaths
Birmingham Black Barons players
Chicago American Giants players
Harrisburg Giants players
Indianapolis ABCs players
Memphis Red Sox players
Montgomery Grey Sox players
St. Louis Stars (baseball) players
Baseball outfielders
Baseball players from Tennessee
Sportspeople from Chattanooga, Tennessee
20th-century African-American sportspeople